Jessi Jae Joplin is an American singer, fashion blogger, model, journalist, and stylist. She is the lead vocalist and songwriter of pop-rock band The Ruckus, a Buzznet Buzzmaker, and founder of fashion blog/vintage store The Fabulous Stains.

Career

Music 
Joplin is the lead singer and songwriter of Jessi Jae Joplin and The Ruckus, a Los Angeles-based electro rock/pop band described as "ripe for exploitation discovery" and having "witchcraft and goth aesthetics". The band has been filmed in a series of webisodes. Of their debut EP, The Thrill, Afropunk contributor Ayara Pommells states, "It’s not completely flawless (very few projects are) but it’s a well put together mini-bite of what’s to come from the young Californian who is well on her way to becoming a leader of the pop rock scene."

Discography 
2014 The Thrill EP

Writing 
Joplin is the fashion editor of The Pulp Zine. She has worked with the fashion designers of Heatherette, in the fashion editorial department of Jane magazine, and for the style editors of E! Online. In August 2013, she was chosen as an official blogger for WWD Magic.

References 

American women pop singers
Female models from California
African-American female models
American fashion journalists
Singers from California
Year of birth missing (living people)
Living people
American women bloggers
American bloggers
American women journalists
21st-century American women writers
21st-century African-American women singers